Soul Burst is an album by Latin jazz vibraphonist Cal Tjader recorded in early 1966 and released on the Verve label.

Reception

The Allmusic review by Scott Yanow awarded the album 3 stars, stating, "the music is quite catchy and accessible, commercial but still creative within the genre".

Track listing
 "Cuchy Frito Man" (Ray Rivera, Vin Roddie) – 2:20
 "Descarga Cubana" (Osvaldo Estivill) – 2:55
 "Soul Burst" (Cal Tjader) – 4:38
 "The Bilbao Song" (Bertolt Brecht, Kurt Weill) – 2:16
 "Manteca" (Gil Fuller, Dizzy Gillespie, Chano Pozo) – 6:34
 "It Didn't End" (João Donato) – 3:55
 "My Ship" (Ira Gershwin, Weill) – 2:59
 "Morning" (Clare Fischer) – 2:56
 "Orán" (Chick Corea) – 3:58
 "Curaçao" (Tjader) – 6:15  
Recorded at Van Gelder Studio in Englewood Cliffs, NJ on February 9 (tracks 3 & 10), February 10 (tracks 2, 6, 8, & 9) and February 11 (tracks 1, 4, 5 & 7), 1966

Personnel
Cal Tjader – vibraphone, cabasa, cymbals
Jerome Richardson, Jerry Dodgion, Seldon Powell – flute
Attila Zoller – guitar
Chick Corea – piano, arranger
Richard Davis, Bobby Rodriguez – bass
Grady Tate – drums
Carlos "Patato" Valdes – congas, vocals
Jose Mangual – timbales, bongos
Victor Pantoja – percussion 
Oliver Nelson – arranger

References

Verve Records albums
Cal Tjader albums
1966 albums
Albums produced by Creed Taylor
Albums recorded at Van Gelder Studio
Albums arranged by Oliver Nelson